Johnson Canyon is a valley or canyon in Juab County, Utah. Its creek drains the eastern watershed of the South Mountains and divides those mountains from the Deep Creek Range to the east.

References 

Valleys of Utah
Landforms of Juab County, Utah